"For My Hand" is a song by Nigerian singer Burna Boy, featuring vocals from English singer-songwriter Ed Sheeran. It was released through Atlantic Records on 8 July 2022 as the second single from Burna Boy's sixth studio album, Love, Damini, along with the album. Burna Boy and Ed Sheeran wrote the song with producer P2J. It marks the second collaboration between the two artists, as they were both featured on British rapper Stormzy's single, "Own It", from his second studio album, Heavy Is the Head (2019). On 30 June 2022, Sheeran brought Burna Boy out during his performance at Wembley Stadium in his home country of the United Kingdom, in which the two artists performed "For My Hand" for the first time.

Composition and lyrics
On "For My Hand", Burna Boy brings Ed Sheeran into his world of music. The love song is focused on emotions and honesty in relationships, as they sing about wanting to be accepted for who they are: "Take me as I am". It has been described as a "wedding-song-worthy vow of mutual devotion through rough times", in which they sing: "Whenever I'm broken, you make me feel whole".

Music video
The official music video for "For My Hand" premiered alongside the release of the song and album on 8 July 2022. Burna Boy and Ed Sheeran sing inside an elevator. The two artists stand at the top of New York City and Burna Boy becomes one with the clouds in the sky. The video ends with a couple dancing in the same elevator, who stay touching each other. They rise up to the sea and the sky as they go to the top of a skyscraper.

Credits and personnel
 Burna Boy – lead vocals, songwriting
 Ed Sheeran – featured vocals, songwriting
 P2J – production, songwriting, recording
 Jesse Ray Ernster – mixing
 Gerhard Westphalen – mastering
 Joe Begalla – mixing assistance
 Noah "MixGiant" Glassman – mixing assistance

Charts

Weekly charts

Year-end charts

Certifications

Release history

References

2022 singles
2022 songs
Burna Boy songs
Songs written by Burna Boy
Ed Sheeran songs
Songs written by Ed Sheeran